Tayebi-ye Garmsiri may refer to:
 Tayebi-ye Garmsiri-ye Jonubi Rural District
 Tayebi-ye Garmsiri-ye Shomali Rural District